Alpha 5 is a science fiction anthology edited by American writer Robert Silverberg, first published in 1974.

Contents
Introduction by Robert Silverberg
"The Star Pit" by Samuel R. Delany
"Baby, You Were Great" by Kate Wilhelm
"Live, From Berchtesgaden" by George Alec Effinger
"As Never Was" by P. Schuyler Miller
"We Can Remember It For You Wholesale" by Philip K. Dick
"Yesterday House" by Fritz Leiber
"A Man Must Die" by John Clute
"The Skills of Xanadu" by Theodore Sturgeon
"A Special Kind of Morning" by Gardner R. Dozois

References
 Goodreads listing for Alpha 5
 MIT Science Fiction Society's Library Pinkdex Entry for Alpha 5

1974 anthologies
Science fiction anthologies
Robert Silverberg anthologies
Ballantine Books books